Pope Zacharias of Alexandria, was the 64th Pope of Alexandria and Patriarch of the See of St. Mark.

He was a native of Alexandria and was an ordained priest there. He was chaste and gentle in disposition.

According to Abu al-Makarim, writing in the last quarter of the twelfth century, Zacharias was the last Patriarch of Alexandria to send letters to the rulers of Nubia and Ethiopia, having been forbidden to do so by the Fatimid Caliph Al-Hakim bi-Amr Allah. Nevertheless, if the Caliph or his vizier received a letter from either ruler, it remained the duty of the Patriarch to write a reply.

Pope Zacharias was buried in Saint Mary Church (Babylon Al-Darag) in Coptic Cairo.

References

Coptic Orthodox saints
Burials at the Church of the Holy Virgin (Babylon El-Darag)
11th-century Coptic Orthodox popes of Alexandria